The 2017–18 season is the season of competitive football (soccer) in Cape Verde.

Diary of the season
October 1: Matches for the 2017-18 Fogo Premier Division were made
October 14: Académico do Aeroporto won their 6th Sal Super Cup title
October 15: FC Derby won their second São Vicente Super Cup title
October 21: Vulcânicos won their second Fogo Super Cup title
October 22: 
the Boa Vista Association Cup begins
the Sal Island Opening Tournament/Association Cup begins
October 24: Académica Operária won their second Boa Vista Super Cup title
October 28:
The 2017-18 Fogo Premier Division begins.
The 2017-18 Maio Super Cup took place between Onze Unidos and Santana de Morrinho, the match was abandoned at the 85th minute due to poor lighting and the edition came without a winner
Sporting Praia won their third Santiago South Super Cup title
Onze Unidos won their only champion's trophy for Maio
November: GD Varanda, 2nd place in Santiago South Second Division last season withdrew, Tira Chapéu, third in that competition competed for the first time in the regional Premier Division
November 3: The 2017-18 Santiago South Premier Division begins
November 4: Brava Opening Tournament begins
November 11:
the 2017-18 Maio Regional Cup begins
SC Santa Maria won their second straight Opening Tournament (Association Cup) title for Sal
November 17: the 2017-18 Santiago North Premier Division begins
November 18: the 2017-18 Sal Island Cup begins
November 25: Rosariense Clube won their only Santo Antão North Super Cup title
November 29: the 2017–18 Santiago South Cup begins
December: the 2017-18 Sal Premier Division begins
December 3: Onze Estrelas of Bofareira won their only Boa Vista Island Association Cup title
December 5: the 2017-18 São Nicolau Cup begins
December 9:
The 2017-18 Boa Vista Island Championships begins
The 2017-18 Fogo Island Cup begins
The 2017-18 Santo Antão North Premier Division begins
The 2017-18 São Vicente Premier Division begins
Sal Premier Division: SC Santa Maria defeated ASGUI 2-9 in Espargos and is the highest result of any second tier competitions in the nation
SC Morabeza becomes Association Cup winners a week before the end of the season
Académica do Porto Novo won their 9th Association Cup for Santo Antão
December 10: the 2016-17 São Nicolau Super Cup may took place
December 16:
the 2017-18 Maio Premier Division begins
the Académica do Porto Novo won their fourth straight Super Cup title for Santo Antão South Super Cup
SC Morabeza won their recent Association Cup winner for Brava
December 22: the Santo Antão South Island Championships unofficially begins
December 23:
the Brava Island Championships to begin
Ultramarina Tarrafal won their recent super cup title for São Nicolau
December 29: the 2016-17 Boa Vista Island Cup to begin
January 6: the 2017-18 São Nicolau Island Championships begins
January 26: Santiago North Premier Division: For the first time, AD Ribeira Grande defeated the island's most powerful club Sporting Praia with the score 2-1
February 13: Académica da Praia defeated Asa Grande 10-0 in the Santiago South Cup and made it the highest scoring match in the regional cup competitions in the nation
February 17: Académica do Fogo defeated ABC de Patim 1-9 and made it the highest scoring match in the Fogo Premier Division to date, one of the highest in the archipelago, the match was later abandoned at the 85th minute as ABC had only six players in the field
February 24:
Académica do Porto Novo made their eight straight win for Santo Antão South with their recent, an 0-5 win over Fiorentina Porto Novo. Académica won another title for the region and will be the second participant into the national championships
Sal Rei defeated Estância Baixo 0-7 and made it the highest scoring match in Boa Vista Island to date
March 2: Santiago South Premier Division: Académica da Praia's point total reached 47 which is a club record over their 2004 and 2017 totals
March 4: Celtic Praia's point total reached 39 which is a club record over their 2016 total
March 10:
Fogo's Vulcânicos defeated Atlético Mosteiros 0-3 and achieved their third straight regional title (11th overall) and will be the third participant into the national championships
Santiago South Premier Division: Académica Praia defeated Eugênio Lima 4-0 and got their 50th point, a club record, in the region, it became third behind Sporting's 55 and Boavista's 51, both made in the previous season
Santiago South Premier Division: Celtic da Praia defeated Travadores 2-0 and got 13 wins and 42 goals, new club records
March 14: 2018 Brava Island Cup begins
March 17: Os Foguetões won their second championship title for Santo Antāo North and will appear in the national championships
March 18: Académica had 53 points, Boavista's draw with Eugénio Lima that day has Académica an eight-point difference, with two rounds to go, Académica became listed as champions of Santiago South, they will have their next regional title in nine years
March 21:
Santiago North's Scorpion Vermelho became champions and will win their fifth title and to appear at the national championships
São Nicolau's Belo Horizonte from Juncalinho in the east of the island became champions and will win their only title and will later made their first appearance at the national championships
March 24:
Rosariense Clube won their cup title for Santo Antão North
March 25:
Sport Sal Rei Club won their 11th title for Boa Vista, also it was their third straight and to appear at the national championships
SC Morabeza won their 10th title for Brava and to appear at the national championships
GD Palmeira de Santa Maria won their third title for Sal and to appear at the national championships, their next in 18 years
Fogo Premier Division: Mosteiros's Cutelinho failed to appear in the last of the two remaining matches with the last one with Nô Pintcha and will relegate for the first time to the Second Division next season
March 27: Santiago South Premier Division: Travadores defeated Sporting Praia 2-1 in the final match of the season
March 29: Académica do Porto Novo won their 13th Santo Antão South Cup title
March 30: Santiago South Premier Division: Celtic defeated Académica 2-1 at the final round
March 31:
Académica Fogo won another Fogo Cup title
SC Santa Maria won their only cup title for Sal
Sport Sal Rei Club won their 7th Boa Vista Cup title, also their fifth straight
Sporting Praia won another Santiago South Cup title
April 1:
Barreirense FC won their third title for Maio and appearing at the national championships, their next in eight years
CS Mindelense won a record breaking 50th title for São Vicente and appearing at the national championships
April 2: Académica Praia finished with a record 56 points and a record 18 wins, in point totals, third overall of any of the regional second tier competitions in the nation
April 4: Onze Unidos won their cup title for Maio
April 7:
the 2018 Cape Verdean Football Championships begins
Batuque won their sixth cup title for São Vicente
April 8: Os Foguetões defeated Morabeza 0-1 in Nova Sintra and was the only victory at the first round
April 14: Mindelense defeated Sal Rei 1-0 and took the lead in Group A
April 22: GD Palmeira of Sal defeated Barreirense 4-2 and was the highest scoring match in the National Division, the sole match for a few weeks
April 28: Barreirense defeated Palmeira 3-1 and is currently the second highest scoring match in the National Division
April 29: Mindelense took the overall lead with 8 points and 4 goals, also are leaders in Group A, Os Foguetões were leader of Group B and Palmeira is leader of Group C, second placed clubs Vulcânicos and Académica Praia had the most points with 7 each
May 13:
Belo Horizonte of São Nicolau defeated Brava's Morabeza 4-0 in Nova Sintra, made it one of two highest scoring matches of the season
The regular season of the National Division ended, Académica Praia, Os Foguetões and Palmeira Santa Maria qualified as leaders of each group, as well Mindelense (of Group A), qualified as the best of three second placed club
May 19: the knockout phase of the National Championships begins
May 20: FC Ultramarina won their 4th cup title for São Nicolau
May 24: SC Morabeza won their recent cup title for Brava
June 2: Académica da Praia won their only national championship title
June 9: Sporting Praia won their only national cup title
July 7: Botafogo of Fogo Island celebrated its 50th year of its foundation

Island and regional competitions

Regional Championships

Regional Cups

Regional Super Cups
The 2016-17 champion winner played with a 2016-17 cup winner (when a club won both, a second place club competed).

Regional Opening Tournaments/Association Cups
Equivalent to a league cup in other countries.

Transfer deals

Summer-Fall transfer window
The September/October transfer window runs from the end of the previous season in September up to mid-October.
 João Paulino from Tchadense to Sporting Praia
 Blessed from Sporting Praia to Boavista Praia
 Panduru from Sporting Praia to Boavista Praia

See also
2017 in Cape Verde
2018 in Cape Verde
Timeline of Cape Verdean football

Notes

References

 
Seasons in Cape Verdean football
2017 in association football
2018 in association football